Stellina is a herbal liqueur made by the monastic order of the  (Holy Family) in Belley, France.
It is considered similar to Chartreuse, both being made by monks in the same region, to secret recipes, and also coming in both green and yellow. However, Stellina is much younger (dating to 1904, rather than 1605), smaller (the Sainte Famille order has 300 members), and much less-known than Chartreuse.

References

External links
Stellina Liqueurs, official site

French liqueurs
Herbal liqueurs